The Church of Christ in the Congo or CCC (in French,  or ECC), is a union of 62 Protestant denominations, in the Democratic Republic of the Congo.

Within the Democratic Republic of the Congo, it is often simply referred to as the Protestant Church, as it federates the vast majority of the Protestants in that country. It is a member of the Fellowship of Christian Councils and Churches in the Great Lakes and Horn of Africa.

History 
The Union has its origins in a grouping of different Protestant and Evangelical churches by missionaries that took place in 1902. It was officially founded in 1924 as the Protestant Council of Congo (CPC). In 1934, it took the name of Church of Christ in Congo.

Functions 
The CCC functions as a religious institution, and provides a central administration and a spiritual forum for the numerous Protestant denominations. It functions under a national synod and an executive committee. Both of these entities are assisted in their tasks by a national secretariat.

The CCC is said to be part of the One, Holy, Catholic, and Apostolic Church, but it also insists on maintaining unity in diversity, as they see it as being the only system common to the Holy Bible, the primitive church, and African traditions.

Leadership 
The Church of Christ in Congo is led by a President that holds the rank of Bishop, and two Vice-Presidents. As of 2005, the First Vice-President is Reverend Mpereboye Mpere, and the Second Vice-President is Reverend Ilunga Mutaka.

The President of the CCC is Monsignor Pierre Marini Bodho. As such, Mgr. Bodho is the presiding minister of the Cathedral of the Protestant Centennial in Congo, also known as the International Protestant Church of Kinshasa - the de facto head church of the CCC.

Following the end of the Second Congo War, transitional institutions were established, consisting of the former warring parties, as well as representatives of the non-belligerent opposition, and representatives of the civil society. Consequently, during the 2003 to 2006 transition period, following the end of the Second Congo War, as a reasonably neutral and consensual figure, and as a representative of the organized religion section of the civil society, Mgr. Marini Bodho served as the President of the Senate, the upper house of the Congolese Parliament.

In the 2006 elections, Mgr. Marini Bodho won a senate seat and is since serving as a senator.

Member communities
Communauté des Assemblées des Frères au Katanga (CAFKAT)
Communauté Baptiste au Kivu (CBK)
Communauté des Eglises des Frères Mennonites au Congo (4ème CEFMC)
Communuatés des Eglises Libres de Pentecôte en Afrique (CELPA)
Communauté des Eglises Baptistes Unies (CEBU)
Communauté des Eglises de Grâce au Congo (GEGC)
Communauté des Eglises de Pentecôte en Afrique Centrale (C.E.P.A.C)
Communauté Evangélique Mennonite (CEM)
Communauté des Disciples du Christ au Congo (CDCC)
Communauté Anglicane au Congo (CAC)
Communauté des Assemblées de Dieu au Congo (CADC)
Communauté Baptiste du Fleuve Congo (CBFC)
Communauté Baptiste du Bas-Uélé (CBCN)
Communauté Baptiste du Congo (CBCO)
Communauté Evangélique du Christ au Cœur de l'Afrique (CECCA)
Communauté Evangélique du Christ eu Ubangi (CECU)
Communauté Evangélique de l'Alliance au Congo (CEAC)
Communauté Evangélique Berreenne au Congo (CEBC)
Communauté Evangélique au Centre de l'Afrique (CECA)
Communauté Nations du Christ en Afrique (CNCA)
Communauté Association des Eglises Evangéliques de la Lulonga (CADELU)
Communauté Evangélique au Congo (CEC)
Communauté Libre de Maniema-Kivu (CLMK)
Communauté Evangélique du Kwango (CEK)
Communauté Libre Méthodiste au Congo (CLMC)
Communauté Mennonite au Congo (CMCO)
Communauté Méthodiste Unie au Congo Central (CMCC)
Communauté Méthodiste au Sud-Congo (CMSC)
Communauté Pentecôtiste au Congo (CPCO)
Communauté Presbytérienne au Congo (CPC)
Communauté Presbytérienne de Kinshasa (CPK)
Communauté Région Sankuru (CRS)
Communauté Assemblée de Dieu à l'Est du Congo (CADAF)
Communauté Union des Eglises Baptistes au Congo (CUEBC)
Communauté Centrale du Christ en Afrique (CCCA)
Communauté des Assemblées de Dieu au Congo (CADC)
Communauté des Frères en Christ Garenganze (CFCG)
Communauté Assemblée des Frères Evangéliques au Congo (CAFECO)
Communauté des Eglises Chrétiennes en Afrique (CECA)
Communauté des Eglises Baptistes Indépendantes Evangéliques (CEBIE)
Communauté Evangélique Congolaise (CECO)
Communauté des Fidèles Protestants (CFP)
Communauté Evangélique de Pentecôte au Katanga (CEPK)
Communauté Protestante au Katanga (CPK)
Communauté des Assemblées des Frères en Christ au Congo (CAFCC)
Communauté Baptiste Autonome Entre Wamba-Bakali (CBAWB)
Communauté Episcopale Baptiste Africaine (CEBA)
Communauté Chrétienne Evangélique au Congo (CCEC)
Communauté Evangélique en Ubangi Mongala (CEUM)
Communauté Evangélique Luthérienne du Congo Ouest (CELCO)
Communauté Baptiste du Sud-Kwango (CBSK)
Communauté Méthodiste Unie au Nord-Katanga (CMUNK)
Communauté des Eglises Baptistes du Congo-Est (CBCE)
Communauté Evangélique du Kasaï-Occidental (CEK-BOOKE)
Communauté Presbytérienne au Kasaï-Occidental (CPKO)
Communauté Presbytérienne au Kasaï-Oriental (CPKO)
Communauté Evangélique Africaine (CEA)
Communauté Réformée Presbytérienne (CRP)
Communauté de Jésus-Christ au Congo (CJCC)
Communauté de Douze Apôtres au Congo (CDAC)
Communauté du Saint-Esprit en Afrique (CSEA)
Communauté Chrétienne de Pentecôte au Congo
Communauté Réformée du Congo

See also

List of the largest Protestant bodies
Free University of the Congo
Pastor François-David_Ekofo

References

External links 
Eglise du Christ au Congo

Protestantism in the Democratic Republic of the Congo
Democratic Republic of Congo
Congo